The Montcalm Hotels are a group of luxury hotels in Central London, England. 

The group includes three hotels (The Montcalm Marble Arch, The Montcalm at The Brewery and The Montcalm Royal London House) under the label "The Montcalm London", and four others (The Marble Arch London, The Chilworth, The Piccadilly London West End and The Barbican Rooms) as "Montcalm Townhouse".

Each of the sites is a five-star hotel. The Montcalm Marble Arch was acquired by Shaftesbury Hotels in 2008.

History
The Montcalm Marble Arch dates from the early 1970s when Piccadilly Estate Hotels Ltd. built it at 2 Wallenberg Place. It opened in 1973 and was originally called The Montcalm, named after the Marquis de Montcalm, the commander of the French forces defeated by the English in the struggle for possession of Canada in 1759. The link between this battle and the building is the Canadian province of Quebec, which had already lent its name to the original mews (Quebec Mews) at the rear of the building. However, the site's history dates back much farther, as suggested by the hotel's crescent-shaped Georgian façade, which, in agreeing to the hotel's construction, Westminster Council insisted should remain.

The façade originally belonged to the building erected as houses at 2 Wallenberg Place on plots leased from the Portman family in 1789. It is likely that each house had four stories (including an attic), each over a basement three bays wide. All the houses came with stabling in Quebec Mews, accessed from New Quebec Street. During the nineteenth century, exterior alterations were made to the houses, including the conversion to cottages of the buildings in Quebec Mews.

Both Wallenberg Place and Quebec Mews are located within Westminster's Portman Square (designated as a conservation area in 1967). The area, part of the parish of St Marylebone, was covered with trees and marshland as part of the forest of Middlesex until, in 1532, Sir William Portman leased the 270 acres that surrounded it. In 1554 the freehold was conveyed in perpetuity to Sir William and his heirs and, three years later in 1757, when Marylebone Road was sited to provide a route to the City bypassing the West End (the New Road), the grid of streets that is now recognizable as the Portman Estate was laid out. Shortly afterwards in 1764, construction of Portman Square and neighboring streets began; the development was completed in 1820.

Hotels

The Montcalm Marble Arch

The Montcalm Marble Arch was acquired by Shaftesbury Hotels in 2008 and, following a £38 million refurbishment program, reopened in September 2010. It was previously owned by Nikko Hotels (part of the JAL Group).

Located in Wallenberg Place, near Park Lane and Oxford Street, this hotel has 153 rooms, a grand ballroom (which can hold between 50 and 550 people), a club lounge, an all-day lounge, a champagne bar and a luxury spa (The Spa at the Montcalm), which comprises a fitness centre, a sauna, a steam room, a Jacuzzi and an exercise pool. The hotel also has two restaurants, The Sixtyone Restaurant and The Crescent brasserie.

In October 2015, the hotel became the first in the Montcalm chain to have a 10 Gigabit Ethernet wide area network (WAN) and Internet connection delivered by Internet service provider Exponential-e Ltd.

On 30 October 2015, the World Boutique Hotel Awards (WBHA) ceremony was held at The Montcalm.

The Marble Arch by The Montcalm London
The Marble Arch by The Montcalm is a smaller site and was once a townhouse.

M By Montcalm Shoreditch Tech City Hotel

M By Montcalm Shoreditch Tech City Hotel is a contemporary-style, 18-storey hotel capable of holding events for 250 delegates. It contains 269 rooms, a business centre, meeting room space on its second floor, a spa and fitness centre, a swimming pool, two bars and two restaurants – one on the ground floor and the other on the 17th floor.

The 17th floor restaurant, Urban Coterie, is overseen by head chef Martin Zahumensky (formerly of restaurants Texture and Hibiscus). The interior design of the restaurant and its Sky Bar, produced by Tonik Associates, takes inspiration from the building's architecture, using traditional materials like brass, timber, bianco marble and leather. A private dining room, which seats 12 people, offers views over the city and the restaurant's menu is billed as a celebration of all things British.

The Montcalm at The Brewery London City
Formerly the site of Whitbread & Co., Britain's first purpose-built mass production brewery, The Montcalm at The Brewery's building is listed and dates back to 1750 when Samuel Whitbread moved his brewing operations to Chiswell Street on the 'eastern rim of Georgian London', now Barbican. The last beer was brewed on the site in 1976, after which it became Whitbread Plc's Head Office and then The Brewery, a conference and banqueting venue.

The hotel contains a gourmet gastropub (The Jugged Hare), a restaurant (Chiswell Street Dining Rooms) and business conference facilities.

London City Suites by Montcalm
Occupying a Grade II listed building opposite its sister hotel (The Montcalm at The Brewery), London City Suites shares the amenities of the latter site.

Technology
At the end of October 2015, a mobile app for iOS and Android was launched to allow visitors to plan and book their stay at the hotels, manage their reservations and get updates on latest deals.

In August 2014, the Montcalm London Marble Arch trained its staff to use the Google Glass to enable them to offer advice on local restaurants, shops, travel plans and directions, freeing them from being behind a desk as they do so.

References

1973 establishments in England
Hotels established in 1973
Hotels in London
Hotel chains in the United Kingdom